The Piaggio P.10 was a 1930s Italian three-seat reconnaissance biplane floatplane produced by Piaggio.

Design and development
The P.10 was a single-bay biplane which was designed to be catapult launched from Italian Navy battleships and cruisers. It had a single main float supplemented by small floats, one on each wingtip. The P.10 was powered by a  licence-built Bristol Jupiter VI radial engine. The aircraft had three open cockpits, one forward of the wings for the pilot, further aft was a cockpit for a gunner, just in front of the tailplane was the third cockpit for the observer. A landplane variant, the P.10bis, had a fixed landing gear.

Specifications (P.10)

See also

References

Notes

Bibliography

P.010
Floatplanes
1930s Italian military reconnaissance aircraft
Single-engined tractor aircraft
Biplanes
Aircraft first flown in 1932